Sibley or Sibly is an English surname. Notable people with the surname include:
Andrew Sibley (1933-2015), Australian artist
Alexander H. Sibley (1817–1878), Canadian businessman
Antoinette Sibley (born 1939), English ballerina
Brian Sibley (born 1949), British writer and broadcaster
Carol Sibley (1902-1986), American civic leader and alumni leader
Celestine Sibley (1914–1999), American author 
Charles Sibley (1917–1998), American ornithologist and molecular biologist
Cyril William Sibley (1923–1945), British airman (RAF), murdered by a German Nazi
David Allen Sibley (born 1961), American ornithologist and author
David Sibley (politician) (born 1948), Texas politician and lobbyist
Dominic Sibley, (born 1993), English cricketer
Ebenezer Sibly, (1751 – c. 1799), English physician, astrologer and writer on the occult
Frank Sibley (philosopher) (1923–1996), British analytic philosopher and aesthetician
George Champlin Sibley, American explorer, soldier, Indian agent
 Harry Sibley (c. 1867–1917), South Australian architect in practice with Daniel Garlick
Henry Hastings Sibley (1811–1891), first Governor of Minnesota
Henry Hopkins Sibley (1816–1886), Confederate general
Hiram Sibley (1807–1888), American entrepreneur
Irena Sibley (1944–2009), artist, children's book author and illustrator
John Langdon Sibley (1804-1885) Librarian and Historian Harvard University
Louie Sibley (born 2001), English football player
Mark Sibley (born 1950), American basketball player
Montgomery Blair Sibley (born 1956), former American lawyer
Mulford Q. Sibley (1912–1989), American political scientist
Robert Sibley (1881-1958), American engineer, founder of park system in California, and alumni leader
Rufus Sibley (1841–1928), American businessman, founder of Sibley, Lindsay & Curr Company department stores 
Solomon Sibley (1769–1846), Delegate to Congress and Supreme Court Justice for Michigan Territory

English-language surnames